Bittersweet Creek is a stream in the U.S. state of South Dakota.

Some say Bittersweet Creek received its name from the peculiar taste of its water, while others believe an abundance of the bittersweet plant caused the name to be selected.

See also
List of rivers of South Dakota

References

Rivers of Pennington County, South Dakota
Rivers of South Dakota